Trimbak (also known as Trimbakeshwar Trayambakēśvara) is a city and a municipal council in Nashik District in the Indian state of Maharashtra. The Trimbakeshwar Shiva Temple is located here, one of the twelve Jyotirlingas, where the Hindu genealogy registers at Trimbakeshwar, Maharashtra are kept. The origin of the sacred Godavari river is near Trimbak.

The Simhastha Kumbh Mela in the Nashik district was originally held at Trimbak, but after 1789 clash between Vaishnavites and Saivites over precedence of bathing, the Maratha Peshwa shifted the Vaishnavites' bathing place to Ramkund in Nashik city. The Shaivites continue to regard Trimbak as the proper location of the Mela.

Geography
It has an average elevation of 720 metres (2362 feet).

Demographics
 India census, Trimbak had a population of 12,056. Males constitute 51% of the population and females 49%. Trimbak has an average effective literacy rate of 89.61%: male literacy is 94.12%, and female literacy is 84.88%. In Trimbak, 11.10% of the population is under 6 years of age.

About Trimbakeshwar

It is dedicated to Lord Shiva and is one of the twelve Jyotirlingas. The extraordinary feature of the Jyotirlinga located here is the Linga in the temple is in the form of a three faced embodying Tridev, Lord Brahma, Lord Vishnu and Lord Shiva. All other Jyotirlingas have Shiva as the main deity. The Linga is crowned with a jewel studded crown believed to be from Pandavas. The crown is adorned with diamonds, emeralds, and many other types of precious stones. Trimbakeshwar town is an ancient Hindu Pilgrim centre located at the source of the Godavari River, the longest river in peninsular India. The Godavari River, which is considered sacred within Hinduism, originates from Bramhagiri mountains at Trimbakeshwar and meets the sea near Rajahmudry.

The town is at the foothills of the Brahmagiri and Gangadwar mountains. Situated in a wooded area, it is a popular destination for tourists and Hindu pilgrims.

History

There was built a city which later on became famous as Trimbakeshwar. In the period of the Peshwas regime Nana Saheb Peshwa had instructed to construct the Trimbakeshwar temple and developed and beautified the city of Trimbakeshwar.

 Neel Mani - Once a large Neel Mani (Blue Diamond), Now named as Nassak Diamond, adorned the Trimbakeshwar temple. The Diamond was looted by English colonel named J. Briggs. from Peshwa Baji Rao II. In turn, Briggs delivered the diamond to Francis Rawdon-Hastings which then went to England.

Religious significance

The Hindu belief is that those who visit Trimbakeshwar attain salvation or Moksha. Trimbakeshwar is considered as the most sacred town India. There are many reasons for this belief. Godavari originates from the Brahmagiri hills in this town and it is believed that it is the birthplace of Lord Ganesha, known as place of Tri-Sandhya Gayatri. This place is believed to be the holiest and ideal place to do Shraddha ceremony, a Hindu ritual for the salvation of the soul.
Sinhastha Mahatmya speaks of Lord Rama having made the Yatra at Trimbakeshwar. A shraddha on the river Godavari gives great satisfaction to the forefathers. If it is not done in this place, it is considered as a religious sin. So Ganga Pujan, Ganga Bhet, Deh Shuddhi Prayaschitta, Tarpan Shraddha, Vayan, Dasha Dana, Gopradan etc. rituals are done in Trimbakeshwar. Mundana and Tirtha Shraddha are also performed here. The Lord Shiva at Trimbakeshwar is worshipped by recitations of Rudra, Rudri, Laghu Rudra, Maha Rudra or Ati Rudra puja. Actually Rudraksha is a religious fruit which is said to be found in Lord Shiva's neck in the form of Rudra garland. Some of the trees of Rudraksha are also found in Trimbakeshwar.
The holy Jyotirlinga circuit will be complete with the visit to this sacred Shiva temple.
Other facilities at Trimbakeshwar
The public and religious institutions in the town are Veda shala, Sanskrit Pathashala, Kirtan Sanstha, Pravachan Sanstha, two gymnasiums, Lokmanya Free Reading Room, municipal office, post and telegraph office, Bus station, dispensary and a police sub-inspector's office. Sanskrit Pathashala has produced a good many disciples who have become Shastris and Pandits.
Noted film maker and father of Indian cinema, Dadasaheb Phalke was born here.
Pradakshina (Ring routes/ Pheri)
There are two pradakshinas (ring routes) in this kshetra - one round the Brahmagiri and the other one round Hariharagiri. Pilgrim has to go for pradakshina with holy garment early in the morning visiting and bathing in various tirthas. The tour is to be completed in either a day, three days.

Godavari River

Brahmadev worshipped God Trivikram when he came to Satya Loka (on earth) with the same holy water of the Ganges, to get the river Ganges held up by God Shankar on his head, to flow. River Ganges in the form of a woman was enjoying with Lord Shiva, which was noticed by Lord Shiva's wife Parvati. She planned to drive Ganges away from her husband.

Parvati and her son Ganesh came to live in Gautama's Ashram with Parvati's friend Jaya. There was a famine of 24 years and people were affected by the pangs of hunger. However, Varun - the God of Rains, pleased with Sage Gautama arranged rains every day in Gautama's Ashram (dwelling place) which was in Trimbakeshwar. Gautama used to sow rice in the surrounding fields of his Ashram in the morning, reap the crop in the afternoon and with it fed a large group of Rishis, who took shelter in his Ashram on account of the famine. The blessings of the group of rishis increased the merit (Punya) of Gautama. Lord Indra's position became shaky because of his increased merit. So Indra ordered clouds to rain all over Trimbakeshwar, so that the famine will be over and Rishis will go back and the increasing merits of Gautama will be weakened. Although the famine was over, Gautama urged the Rishis to stay back and kept on feeding them and gaining merit.
Once he saw a cow grazing in the paddy field and he drove her away by throwing Darbha (sharp, pointed grass). The slender cow died by this. It was Jaya - Parvati's friend, who had taken the form of a cow. This news upset the Rishis and they refused to luncheon at his Ashram. Gautama requested Rishis to show a way out of this sin. He was advised to approach Lord Shiva and request him to release Ganges and a bath in the Ganges would set him free of his sins.
Gautama then practiced penance by going to the peak of Brahmagiri. Lord Shankara was pleased by his worships and gave him the Ganges. However, Ganges was not prepared to part with Lord Shiva, which irritated him. He made TandavNrutya (dance) on the peak of Brahmagiri and dashed his jata there. Frightened by this action, Ganges appeared on Brahmagiri. Later on Ganges appeared in the Trimbak Tirtha. Gautama praised her but she off and on appeared on the mountain at various places and disappeared in anger. Gautama could not bathe in her waters. Ganges then appeared in Gangadwar, Varaha-tirtha, Rama-Laxman tirtha, Ganga Sagar tirtha. Still Gautama could not bathe in her waters. The Gautama surrounded the river with enchanted grass and put a vow to her. The flow stopped there and the tirtha thus came to be called Kushavarta. It is from this Kushavarta that the river Godavari flows up to the sea. The sin of killing a cow by Gautama was wiped off here.

Pujas performed here

This place is famous for a number of Hindu religious rituals (vidhis). Narayan nagbali, Kalsarpa Shanti, Tripindi vidhi etc. are done here. Narayan Nagbali puja is unique to Trimbakeshwar. This puja is performed for three days. This puja is performed on special dates (muhurt). Some days in the year are not suitable to perform this puja. This puja is performed for many reasons like to cure an illness, going through bad times, killing a Cobra (Nag), childless couples, financial crisis or you want to perform some religious puja to have a peaceful & happy life to you and your family members.

Accommodation

There are many small and big Hotels in Trimbakeshwar city. Some of them are Hotel Sahyadri, Hotel Krushna Inn, Hotel Dhruv Palace, Hotel Sanskruti Holiday Resort, Shubham Water World, Sai Krupa Hotel Kaka, Hotel Sai Yatri.

References

Cities and towns in Nashik district
Hindu holy cities